Kangza Nzeza (born in 1973 in the Democratic Republic of the Congo) is a Democratic Republic of the Congo retired footballer.

References

Association football forwards
Living people
1973 births
Democratic Republic of the Congo footballers
Kaizer Chiefs F.C. players
Juan Aurich footballers
21st-century Democratic Republic of the Congo people